Shuangfeng Township is a township in Shaodong, Hunan, China. It borders the towns of Jiulongling and Xiancha in the north, Jianjialong Town in the east, Qidong County and Qiyang County in the south, and Shaoyang County in the west.

History
Shuangfeng was incorporated as a township in 1956. In 1965 it was renamed "Shuangfeng People's Commune". In December 1979, it came under the jurisdiction of Lianyuan. In August 1983, it was under the administration of Shaodong County. It was restored as a township in 1984.

Administrative division
As of 2015, the township is divided into twenty-five villages: 
Dongnan
Liujia
Ma'an
Haiping
Qinfu
Dachong
Fu'an
Guqi
Qilin
Hongma
Chuanxing
Dajin
Shuangfeng
Fengxing
Yongjiu
Zhonghe
Yingfeng
Yuejin
Jinlong
Yuqing
Fuxing
Shuijing
Xiangfu
Caojia
Daxing

Geography
There are eight reservoirs in the township.

Economy
The local economy is primarily based upon agriculture and local industry. The main fruits are walnut, grapefruit, pear, and peach. The township is rich in Dolomite.

Attractions
Qidanling Karst Cave Group are famous scenic spots in Shaodong.

Sandu Reservoir open to visitors for free. Fishing and hiking are activities around the lake.

References

Divisions of Shaodong